is the debut album by GO!GO!7188, released in 2000. The album’s title literally translates as "useless walking."

Track listing 

2000 albums
GO!GO!7188 albums